El Sendero Luminoso is the name of a rock climb at El Potrero Chico, Nuevo León, Mexico. A big wall sport-route, El Sendero Luminoso rises over 1500 ft (~450 m) up the front side of El Toro. The route was established by Jeff Jackson, Kurt Smith, and Pete Peacock and is graded 5.12+ V (15 pitches).

On January 15, 2014, Alex Honnold became the first person to free-solo the route, taking just over three hours.  On November 27, 2019, the American rock climber Brad Gobright fell approximately 300 meters to his death while descending from the route with his climbing partner, Aidan Jacobson who fell between 20 and 30 meters and survived.

References

Climbing routes
Climbing areas of Nuevo León
Geography of Mexico